Rashid Jaber Al Yafi´i is an Omani football manager who manages Seeb.

Career

Jaber started his managerial career with Omani side Dhofar, helping them win the league and 1999 Sultan Qaboos Cup. In 1999, he was appointed manager of Al Nasr (Salalah) in Oman, helping them win the 2000 Sultan Qaboos Cup.

In 2001, Jaber was appointed manager of Oman. In 2022, he was appointed manager of Omani club Seeb, helping them win the 2022 AFC Cup, the only AFC trophy an Omani club has ever won.

References

Al-Seeb Club managers
Dhofar Club managers
Dhofar Club players
Living people
Oman national football team managers
Oman Professional League managers
Oman Professional League players
Omani football managers
Omani footballers
Year of birth missing (living people)